Eban may refer to:

Eban (name)
EBAN, European business investment organization
Eban, Dzheyrakhsky District, village in the Republic of Ingushetia, Russia

See also

Eban number
Eben